The following is a list of state-level presidents pro tempore in the United States:

References 

United States,State Presidents Pro Tem
States of the United States-related lists